Dancemania is a series of remix compilation albums by i-DANCE. The series deals primarily with dance music, especially Eurodance. Despite many of its tracks being made by various musicians from all over the world and mainly from the European continent, the albums have been released exclusively in Japan.

The first issue, Dancemania 1, was released on April 10, 1996, with artists including E-Rotic, Cut 'N' Move, Me & My, Maxx, Basic Element, Magic Affair, Odyssey, Captain Jack, Interactive, Space Pilots, and DJ Quicksilver as the leading mixer. 1 debuted at number 14 on the Oricon weekly album chart in April 1996 and reached number 4 in the same chart in May 1996 and ranked number 56 in the yearly Top 100 best-selling album chart in 1996 with 480,980 copies sold.

Dancemania has spawned many sub-series projects, such as Summers & Winters, Bass, Euro Mix, Super Techno, Classics, Delux, Game, Club, Zip Mania, Trance, Trance Paradise, Covers and Speed. Many of these sub-series have further each spawned their own sub-series projects.

The series released approximately 50 volumes in its first four years and the label claims that over 10 million copies were sold by the end of the 20th century. Some of song later appear on Spotify.

Many songs from the series have been licensed for use in Bemani games by Konami, such as Dance Dance Revolution or Dance Maniax.

Releases

Main series
 Nonstop Megamix Dancemania 1 – 10, 20 – 22
 Nonstop Megamix Dancemania X1 – X9 (a.k.a. 11 – 19)
 Nonstop Megamix Dancemania EX 1 – EX 9
 Nonstop Megamix Dancemania Best Yellow
 Nonstop Megamix Dancemania Best Red
 Dancemania Tre*Sure 10th Anniversary Special Edition
 Dancemania Sparkle – Best of 90s Dance Pop

Sub series

Summers and Winters
Summers mainly features Latin dance and reggae. Winters mainly features handbag house, breakbeat and big beat.
 Nonstop Megamix Dancemania Summers 1 – 3
 Nonstop Megamix Dancemania Summers 2001
 Nonstop Megamix Dancemania Winters 1 – 2
 Nonstop Megamix Dancemania Winters Rock Groove

Speed
These features Hardcore and Happy Hardcore songs and remixes.
 Nonstop Megamix Dancemania Speed 1 – 10
 Classical Speed 1 – 2
 Hyper Nonstop Megamix Dancemania Speed G1 – G5
 Happy Speed The Best of Dancemania Speed G
 Hyper Nonstop Megamix Dancemania Speed Best 2001
 Nonstop Megamix Dancemania Speed Presents Happy Ravers
 Nonstop Megamix Dancemania Speed Presents Trance Ravers
 Dancemania Speed Presents Best of Hardcore
 Nonstop Megamix Dancemania Speed SFX
 Hyper Nonstop Megamix Christmas Speed
 Hyper Nonstop Megamix Dancemania Speed TV
 Nonstop Megamix Speed Deka
 Nonstop Megamix Anime Speed
 Anime Speed Newtype Edition
 Speedrive
 Nonstop Megamix Speed Buyuuden

Bass
These features Miami Bass, Drum 'n' Bass and Jungle songs.
 Nonstop Megamix Dancemania Bass #0 – #11

Euro Mix
In this sub-series, "euro" means Eurobeat and Europop.
 Nonstop Megamix Dancemania Euro Mix Happy Paradise 1 – 2
 Dancemania Presents J:Paradise
 Dancemania EURO CLASSICS

Super Techno
 Nonstop Megamix Dancemania Super Techno I – II
 Nonstop Megamix Dancemania Super Techno Best

Classics
Classics features vintage tracks of Eurobeat/Hi-NRG/R&B from the late 1970s–1980s club scene.
 Dancemania Classics
 Nonstop Megamix Dancemania Euro Classics
 Nonstop Megamix Dancemania Club Classics 1 – 2
 Nonstop Megamix Dancemania SuperClassics 1 – 3
 Nonstop Megamix Dancemania SuperClassics Best
 Nonstop Megamix Dancemania 80's
 Non-stop Essential Mix Dancemania 80's Two
 Dancemania Sparkle Classics – Best of 80s Disco Pop

Trance Paradise
 Trance Paradise The Best
 Hime Trance 1 – 4
 Himetra Best
 Himetra Speed
 Himetra Presents Tsukasa Mix
 Himetra Anime*Mix
 Hostrance 1 – 2
 Auto Gallery Tokyo 2006
 Kabatra

Others
 Non-stop Megamix Dancemania Sports
 Dancemania presents Disco Groove
 Nonstop Megamix Disco Viking
 Nonstop Megamix Disco Viking Megamix
 Dancemania Presents Summer Story 2007 Supported by 9LoveJ
 Dancemania Presents Summer Story 2008 Supported by Club J
 Dancemania Presents Summer Story 2009

Special series
 Dancemania Delux 1 – 5
 Nonstop Megamix Dancemania Hyper Delux
 Nonstop Megamix Dancemania Extra
 Nonstop Megamix Dancemania Diamond
 Dancemania Diamond Complete Edition

Tie-up series

Game

D.D.R.
 Dance Dance Revolution 2nd Mix Original Soundtrack Presented by Dancemania
 Dance Dance Revolution 3rd Mix Original Soundtrack Presented by Dancemania
 Dance Dance Revolution Solo 2000 Original Soundtrack Presented by Dancemania
 Dance Dance Revolution 4th Mix Original Soundtrack Presented by Dancemania
 Dance Dance Revolution 5th Mix Original Soundtrack Presented by Dancemania
 DDRMAX Dance Dance Revolution 6th Mix Original Soundtrack Presented by Dancemania
 DDRMAX2 Dance Dance Revolution 7th Mix Original Soundtrack Presented by Dancemania
 Original Soundtrack Dance Dance Revolution Extreme
 Original Soundtrack Dance Dance Revolution Party Collection
 Dance Dance Revolution Festival & Strike Original Soundtrack Presented by Dancemania
 Dance Dance Revolution 2nd Mix Original Soundtrack Presented by Dancemania (re-release)

Dance Maniax
 Original Soundtrack Dance Maniax
 Original Soundtrack Dance Maniax 2nd Mix

Beatmania
 Beatmania 5th Mix Original Soundtrack Presented by Dancemania
 Beatmania 6th Mix Original Soundtrack Presented by Dancemania

Club
 Non-stop Mix Fura Mania
 Dancemania Presents Club The Earth I – II
 Dancemania Presents Club The Earth Disco Classics
 Dancemania Presents Two Face
 Dancemania CLUB CLASSICS 1-2

Zip Mania
 Dancemania featuring Nagoya-based radio station Zip-FM.
 Nonstop Megamix Zip Mania 1 – 7

Giants Mania
 Dancemania Presents Giants Mania

Trance
 The Best of World Trance FantasiA 1 – 3
 Trance Mania 1 – 3
 Nonstop Megamix Dancemania Trance Z 1 – Z 2
 Nonstop Megamix Dancemania Super Trance Best

Covers
Covers features cover versions of various famous songs remixed and covered by dance music acts.
Dancemania COVERS
Dancemania COVERS 2
Dancemania COVERS 01

Artist
 Dancemania Presents E-Rotic Megamix
 Dancemania Presents Scorccio Super Hit Mix
 Dancemania Presents Cartoons Toontastic!
 Dancemania Presents Captain Jack Captain's Best - Best Hits and New Songs -
 The Very Best of E-Rotic
 Dancemania Presents Captain Jack Party Warriors

Video series
 Nonstop Megamix * Video Happy Paradise Para Para Mania

References

External links
Official Dancemania website (in Japanese; archived)

 
Eurodance compilation albums